CocoonJS was a mobile development framework produced by Ludei, a San Francisco-based startup founded by serial entrepreneur Eneko Knörr. It enables software developers to build mobile apps using JavaScript, HTML5, and CSS3, instead of device-specific languages such as Objective-C. It enables wrapping up of HTML, CSS and Javascript code depending upon the platform of the device. It extends the features of HTML and Javascript to work with the device. The platform is similar to Adobe PhoneGap but claims significant improvements.

Development on the framework stopped in 2017. Ludei ceased operations in 2019.

Engines with CocoonJS support 

 AngularJS
 Backbone.js
 Construct 2
 Famo.us
 Goo Engine
 Handlebars.js
 ImpactJS
 Ludei CAAT
 melonJS
 Panda.js
 Phaser
 Pixi.js
 PlayCanvas
 Wozlla

References

External links
 CocoonJS
 Cocoon.io website

Android (operating system) development software
BlackBerry development software
IOS
Rich web application frameworks